Rukai may refer to:
Rukai people
Rukai language

Language and nationality disambiguation pages